Chen Gang is a Chinese actor. He is most noted for his lead performance in the 2016 film Old Stone, for which he garnered a Canadian Screen Award nomination for Best Actor at the 5th Canadian Screen Awards.

References

External links

Chinese male film actors
Living people
Year of birth missing (living people)